Weingartner or Weingärtner is a German surname meaning "wine gardener", and may refer to:

 Felix Weingartner (1863–1942), conductor, composer and pianist
 Hans Weingartner (born 1970), Austrian author, director and producer of films
 Hermann Weingärtner (1864–1919), German gymnast
 Marlene Weingärtner (born 1980), German professional tennis player

See also

 Weingarten (disambiguation)

Occupational surnames
German-language surnames
Jewish surnames